Stranded: I've Come from a Plane that Crashed on the Mountains is a 2007 documentary film which tells the  story of a rugby team from Uruguay who boarded Uruguayan Air Force Flight 571. The film features interviews with the survivors who recount their struggle to survive after the plane crashed in the Andes Mountains and the survivors cannibalized the deceased. Stranded was nominated for the Grand Jury Prize for Documentary at the 2008 Sundance Film Festival, and won the Outstanding Directorial Achievement in Documentary at the 2008 Directors Guild of America Awards. It had its major U.S. cities theatrical premieres on October 22 in New York and in Los Angeles on November 7.

Critical reception
The film appeared on some critics' top ten lists of the best films of 2008. Shawn Levy of The Oregonian named it the 5th best film of 2008, and Kenneth Turan of the Los Angeles Times named it the 8th best film of 2008 (in a six-way tie).

See also
 Survival film, about the film genre, with a list of related films

References

External links 
 
 
 

2007 films
Documentary films about aviation accidents or incidents
Documentary films about Uruguay
Uruguayan Air Force Flight 571
Works about cannibalism